Kristiansands Turnforening is a Norwegian gymnastics club from Kristiansand, founded on 17 October 1858.

Two Olympic gymnasts have represented the club: 1906 gold medalist Johan Stumpf and 1912 gold medalist Øistein Schirmer.

References

 Official site 

Sport in Kristiansand
Sports clubs established in 1858
1858 establishments in Norway
Gymnastics clubs in Norway